Oleg Vladimirovich Penkovsky (23 April 1919 – 16 May 1963), codenamed HERO, was a Soviet military intelligence (GRU) colonel during the late 1950s and early 1960s. Penkovsky informed the United States and the United Kingdom about Soviet military secrets, most importantly, the appearance and footprint of Soviet intermediate-range ballistic missile installations and the weakness of the Soviet intercontinental ballistic missile program. This information was decisive in allowing the US to recognize that the Soviets were placing missiles in Cuba before most of them were operational. It also gave US President John F. Kennedy, during the Cuban Missile Crisis that followed, valuable information about Soviet weakness that allowed him to face down Soviet leader Nikita Khrushchev and resolve the crisis without a nuclear war. 

Penkovsky was the highest-ranking Soviet official to provide intelligence for the West up until that time, and is one of several individuals credited with altering the course of the Cold War. He was arrested by the Soviets in October 1962, and then tried and executed the following year.

Early life and military career
Penkovsky never knew his father, who was killed fighting as an officer in the White Army in the Russian Civil War when he was a baby. Brought up in the North Caucasus, Penkovsky graduated from the Kiev Artillery Academy with the rank of lieutenant in 1939. After taking part in the Winter War against Finland and in World War II, he reached the rank of lieutenant-colonel. In 1944, he was assigned to the headquarters of Colonel-General Sergei Varentsov, commander of artillery on the 1st Ukrainian front, who became his patron. Penkovsky was wounded in action in 1944, at about the same time as Varentsov, who appointed him his Liaison Officer. In 1945, Penkovsky married the teenage daughter of Lieutenant-General Dmitri Gapanovich, thus acquiring another high-ranking patron. On Varentsov's recommendation, he studied at the Frunze Military Academy in 1945-48, then worked as a staff officer.

Penkovsky joined the GRU as an officer, in 1953. In 1955 Penkovsky was appointed military attaché in Ankara, Turkey, but was recalled after he had reported his superior officer, and later other GRU personnel for a breach of regulations, which made him unpopular in the department. Relying once again on Varentsov's patronage, he spent nine months studying rocket artillery at Dzerzhinsky Military Academy. He was selected for the post of military attaché in India, but the KGB had uncovered the story of his father's death, and he was suspended, investigated, and assigned in November 1960 to the State Committee for Science and Technology. He later worked at the Soviet Committee for Scientific Research.

Overtures to CIA and MI6
Penkovsky approached American students on the Bolshoy Moskvoretsky Bridge in Moscow in July 1960 and gave them a package in which he offered to spy for the United States.  He asked them to deliver it to an intelligence officer at the US Embassy. The CIA delayed in contacting him. When the US Embassy in Moscow refused to cooperate, fearing an international incident, the CIA contacted MI6 for assistance. 

Greville Wynne, a British salesman of industrial equipment to countries behind the Iron Curtain, was recruited by MI6 to communicate with Penkovksy. In his autobiography, Wynne says that he was carefully developed by British intelligence over many years with the specific task of making contact with Penkovsky.

The first meeting between Penkovsky and two American and two British intelligence officers occurred during a visit by Penkovsky to London in April 1961. For the following 18 months, Penkovsky supplied a tremendous amount of information to the CIA–MI6 team of handlers, including documents demonstrating that the Soviet nuclear arsenal was much smaller than Nikita Khrushchev claimed or the CIA had thought and that the Soviets were not yet capable of producing a large number of ICBMs. This information was invaluable to President John F. Kennedy in negotiating with Nikita Khrushchev for the removal of the Soviet missiles from Cuba.

Peter Wright, a former British MI5 officer known for his scathing condemnation of the leadership of British intelligence during most of the Cold War, believed that Penkovsky was a fake defection. Wright noted that, unlike Igor Gouzenko and other earlier defectors, Penkovsky did not reveal the names of any Soviet agents in the West but only provided organisational detail, much of which was known already. Some of the documents provided were originals, which Wright thought could not have been easily taken from their sources. Wright was bitter towards British intelligence, reportedly believing that it should have adopted his proposed methods to identify British/Soviet double agents. In Wright's view, the failure of British intelligence leaders to listen to him caused them to become paralysed when such agents defected to the Soviet Union; in his book, Spycatcher, he suggests that his hypothesis had to be true, and that the Soviets were aware of this paralysis and planted Penkovsky.

In his memoir Spycatcher: The Candid Autobiography of a Senior Intelligence Officer (1987), written with journalist Paul Greengrass, Wright says:

Former KGB major-general Oleg Kalugin does not mention Penkovsky in his comprehensive memoir about his career in intelligence against the West. The KGB defector Vladimir N. Sakharov suggests Penkovsky was genuine, saying: "I knew about the ongoing KGB reorganisation precipitated by Oleg Penkovsky's case and Yuri Nosenko's defection. The party was not satisfied with KGB performance ... I knew many heads in the KGB had rolled again, as they had after Stalin". While the weight of opinion seems to be that Penkovsky was genuine, the debate underscores the difficulty faced by all intelligence agencies of determining information offered from the enemy. In a meeting with US Secretary of Defense Leon Panetta, the head of Russia's foreign intelligence service, Mikhail Fradkov, named Penkovsky as Russia's biggest intelligence failure.

Cuban Missile Crisis 

The Soviet leadership began the deployment of nuclear missiles, in the belief that Washington would not detect the Cuban missile sites until it was too late to do anything about them. Penkovsky provided plans and descriptions of the nuclear rocket launch sites in Cuba to the West. This information allowed the West to identify the missile sites from the low-resolution pictures provided by US U-2 spy planes. The documents provided by Penkovsky showed that the Soviet Union was not prepared for war in the area, which emboldened Kennedy to risk the operation in Cuba. Former GRU captain Viktor Suvorov, who defected to the UK in 1978, later wrote in his book on Soviet intelligence, "historians will remember with gratitude the name of the GRU Colonel Oleg Penkovsky. Thanks to his priceless information the Cuban crisis was not transformed into a last World War".

Penkovsky's activities were revealed by Jack Dunlap, a National Security Agency (NSA) employee and Soviet spy working for the KGB. Top KGB officers had known for more than a year that Penkovsky was a British agent, but they protected their source, a highly placed mole in MI6. Dunlap was just another source they had to protect. They worked hard, shadowing British diplomats, to build up a "discovery case" against Penkovsky so that they could arrest him without throwing suspicion on their own moles. Their caution in this matter may have led to the missiles being discovered earlier than the Soviets would have preferred. After a West German agent overheard a remark at Stasi headquarters, paraphrased as "I wonder how things are going in Cuba" he passed it on to the CIA.

Penkovsky was arrested on 22 October 1962. This was prior to President Kennedy's address to the US revealing that U-2 spy plane photographs had confirmed intelligence reports that the Soviets were installing medium-range nuclear missiles in Cuba, in what was known as Operation Anadyr. Kennedy was deprived of information from a potentially important intelligence agent, such as reporting that Khrushchev was already looking for ways to defuse the situation, which might have lessened the tension during the ensuing 13-day stand-off. That information might have reduced the pressure on Kennedy to launch an invasion of the island, which could have risked Soviet use of 9K52 Luna-M-class tactical nuclear weapons against U.S. troops.

Arrest and death

Penkovsky's American contacts received a letter from him notifying them that a Moscow dead drop had been loaded. Upon servicing the dead drop, the American handler was arrested, signaling that Penkovsky had been apprehended by Soviet authorities. Penkovsky was executed but there are conflicting reports about the manner of his death. Alexander Zagvozdin, chief KGB interrogator for the investigation, stated that Penkovsky had been "questioned perhaps a hundred times" and that he had been shot and cremated. The noted Soviet sculptor Ernst Neizvestny said that he had been told by the director of the Donskoye Cemetery crematorium "how Penkovsky [had been] executed by 'fire'". A similar description was later included in Ernest Volkman's popular history book about spies, Tom Clancy's novel Red Rabbit and in Viktor Suvorov's book Aquarium. In a 2010 interview, Suvorov denied that the man in the film was Penkovsky and said that he had been shot. Greville Wynne, in his book The Man from Odessa, claimed that Penkovsky killed himself. Wynne had worked as both Penkovsky's contact and courier; both men were arrested by the Soviets in October 1962.

Repercussions 
The Soviet public was first told of Penkovsky's arrest more than seven weeks later, when Pravda named Wynne and Jacobs as his contacts, without naming anyone else. In May 1963, after his trial, Izvestya reported that Varentsov, who had since achieved the rank of Chief Marshal of Artillery and Commander in Chief of Rocket Forces and candidate member of the Central Committee had been demoted to the rank of Major General. In June he was expelled from the Central Committee for 'having relaxed his political vigilance.' Three other officers were also disciplined. The head of the GRU, Ivan Serov was sacked during the same period. He was reputedly on friendly terms with Penkovsky, which is very likely to have been a cause of his fall.

Portrayal in popular culture
Penkovsky was portrayed by Christopher Rozycki in the 1985 BBC Television serial Wynne and Penkovsky. His spying career was the subject of episode 1 of the 2007 BBC Television docudrama Nuclear Secrets, titled "The Spy from Moscow" in which he was portrayed by Mark Bonnar. The programme featured original covert KGB footage showing Penkovsky photographing classified information and meeting up with Janet Chisholm, a British MI6 agent stationed in Moscow. It was broadcast on 15 January 2007.

Penkovsky was referred to in four of Tom Clancy's Jack Ryan espionage novels: The Hunt for Red October (1984), The Cardinal of the Kremlin (1988), The Bear and the Dragon (2000) and Red Rabbit (2002). In the Jack Ryan universe, he is described as the agent who recruited Colonel Mikhail Filitov as a CIA agent (code-name CARDINAL) and had urged Filitov to betray him to solidify his position as the West's top spy in the Soviet hierarchy. The "cremated alive" hypothesis appears in several Clancy novels, though Clancy never identified Penkovsky as the executed spy. Penkovsky's fate is also mentioned in the Nelson DeMille spy novel The Charm School (1988).

Penkovsky was portrayed by Eduard Bezrodniy in the 2014 Polish thriller Jack Strong, about Ryszard Kukliński, another Cold War spy. His character's execution was the opening scene for the movie. Penkovsky was portrayed by Merab Ninidze in the 2020 British film The Courier, in which Benedict Cumberbatch played Greville Wynne.

See also
Gervase Cowell
George Kisevalter

References

Sources

Further reading

Note: The book was commissioned by the Central Intelligence Agency 
see: . 
A 1976 Senate commission stated that "the book was prepared and written by witting agency assets who drew on actual case materials." 
See:  
Note: Author Frank Gibney denied the CIA had forged the provided source material, which was also the opinion of Robert Conquest. Other dismissed the book as propaganda and having no historic value.
  Robert Wallace and H. Keith Melton, with Henry R. Schlesinger, Spycraft: The Secret History of the CIA's Spytechs, from Communism to al-Qaeda, New York, Dutton, 2008. 
 Frederick Forsyth, The Deceiver, Bantam Books, 1992 , p. 43, 4th line.
 Viktor Suvorov, Devil's Mother, Sofia, Fakel Express, 2011 , in Bulgarian language.

External links

 
 John Simkin. Oleg Penkovsky, Spartacus Educational
 cia.gov The Capture and Execution of Colonel Penkovsky, 1963 
 Joseph J. Bulik. Oral History, Penkovsky's CIA case officer
 
 'Fatal Encounter' BBC TV documentary 3 May 1991, KGB, MI6 and CIA officers involved with the Penkovsky reveal their stories
 

1919 births
1963 deaths
Soviet people executed for spying for the United States
British spies against the Soviet Union
GRU officers
People from Vladikavkaz
Russian people executed by the Soviet Union
Executed people from North Ossetia–Alania
Executed Soviet people from Russia
Soviet military attachés
Double agents